Encyclopedia Americana is a general encyclopedia written in American English. It was the first major multivolume encyclopedia that was published in the United States. With Collier's Encyclopedia and Encyclopædia Britannica, Encyclopedia Americana became one of the three major English-language general encyclopedias: The three were sometimes collectively called "the ABCs". Following the acquisition of Grolier in 2000, the encyclopedia has been produced by Scholastic.

The encyclopedia has more than 45,000 articles, most of them more than 500 words and many running to considerable length (the "United States" article is over 300,000 words). Americana is international in scope and is known for its detailed coverage of American and Canadian geography and history. Americana is also known for its strong coverage of biographies, and scientific and technical subjects. Written by 6,500 contributors, the Encyclopedia Americana includes over 9,000 bibliographies, 150,000 cross-references, 1,000+ tables, 1,200 maps, and almost 4,500 black-and-white line art and color images. It also has 680 factboxes. Major articles are signed by their contributors, many being scholars pre-eminent in their field.

Long available as a 30-volume print set, the Encyclopedia Americana is now marketed as an online encyclopedia requiring a subscription. In March 2008, Scholastic said that print sales remained good but that the company was still deciding on the future of the print edition. The company’s final print edition was released in 2006.

The online version of the Encyclopedia Americana, first introduced in 1996, continues to be updated and sold. This work, like the print set from which it is derived, is designed for high school and first-year college students along with public library users. It is available to libraries as one of the options in the Grolier Online reference service, which also includes the Grolier Multimedia Encyclopedia, intended for middle and high school students, and The New Book of Knowledge, an encyclopedia for elementary and middle school students. Grolier Online is not available to individual subscribers.

History and predecessors 

There have been three separate works using the title Encyclopedia Americana.

The first began publishing in the 1820s by the German exile Francis Lieber. The 13 volumes of the first edition were completed in 1833, and other editions and printings followed in 1835, 1836, 1847–1848, 1849 and 1858. Lieber's work was based upon and was in no small part a translation of the 7th edition of the well-established Konversations-Lexikon of Brockhaus. Some material from this set was carried over into the modern version, as well as the Brockhaus short article method.

A second Encyclopedia Americana was published by J.M. Stoddart between 1883 and 1889, as a supplement to American reprintings of the 9th edition of the Encyclopædia Britannica. It was four quarto volumes meant to "extend and complete the articles in Britannica". Stoddart's work, however, is not connected to the earlier work by Lieber.

In 1902, a new, 16 volume Encyclopedia Americana was published under the editorial supervision of Scientific American magazine. The magazine's editor, Frederick Converse Beach, was editor-in-chief, assisted by hundreds of eminent scholars and authorities as consulting editors and article authors. George Edwin Rines was appointed managing editor in 1903. Between 1903 and 1906 the publisher was R.S. Peale & Co.  From 1906 through 1936, Encyclopedia Americana was published by the Americana Corporation, with the editorial support of Scientific American. The relationship with Scientific American was terminated in 1911. From 1907 to 1912, the encyclopedia was published as The Americana.

In 1918–20, the Americana Corporation published a new, 30 volume edition, with George Edwin Rines continuing as editor-in-chief. A yearbook, which has appeared under a variety of titles, was also published each year beginning in 1923 and continuing until 2008.

In 1936, the Americana Corporation was purchased by The Grolier Society, later renamed Grolier Incorporated. The Americana Corporation's president, J. Cooper Graham, became a vice president of Grolier. By the late1960s, Grolier's annual sales of Encyclopedia Americana and its sister publications under Grolier—The Book of Knowledge, the American Peoples Encyclopedia, the Book of Popular Science, and Lands and Peoples were over $181 million, and the company held a 30 percent market share as the leading publisher of encyclopedias in the United States. Grolier's corporate headquarters were in a large building (variously named the Americana Building and the Grolier Building) in Midtown Manhattan, at 575 Lexington Avenue. Sales during this period were accomplished primarily through mail-order and door-to-door operations. Telemarketing and third-party distribution of Encyclopedia Americana through Grolier's Lexicon Publications subsidiary added to sales volumes in the 1970s. By the late 1970s, Grolier had moved its operations to Danbury, Connecticut.

Later developments 
In 1988, Grolier was purchased by the French media company Hachette, which owned a well-known French-language encyclopedia, the Hachette Encyclopedia. Hachette was later absorbed by the French conglomerate the Lagardère Group.

A CD-ROM version of the encyclopedia was published in 1995. Although the text and images were stored on separate disks, it was in keeping with standards current at the time. More importantly, the work had been digitized, allowing for release of an online version in 1997. Over the next few years the product was augmented with additional features, functions, supplementary references, Internet links, and current events journal. A redesigned interface and partly reengineered product, featuring enhanced search capabilities and a first-ever ADA-compliant, text-only version for users with disabilities, was presented in 2002.

The acquisition of Grolier by Scholastic for US$400 million, took place in 2000. The new owners projected a 30% increase in operating income, although historically Grolier had experienced earnings of 7% to 8% on income. Following the acquisition, Americana became part of a suite of educational resources. Staff reductions as a means of controlling costs also followed soon thereafter, even while an effort was made to augment the sales force. Cuts occurred every year between 2000 and 2007, leaving a much-depleted work force to carry out the duties of maintaining a large encyclopedia database.

In 2004, Scholastic stated that Americana’s 2,500 online articles are being revised annually. Today, Americana lives on as an integral database within the Grolier Online product.

Editors-in-Chief 
 Frederick Converse Beach, 1902–1917. Engineer and editor of Scientific American magazine.
 George Edwin Rines, 1917–1920. Author and editor.
 A. H. McDannald, 1920–1948. Reporter (Baltimore News and Baltimore Evening Sun), editor, and author.
 Lavinia P. Dudley, 1948–1964. Editor (Encyclopædia Britannica and Encyclopedia Americana) and manager; first woman to head a major American reference publication.
 George A. Cornish, 1965–1970. Reporter (New York Herald Tribune) and editor.
 Bernard S. Cayne, 1970–1980. Educational researcher (Educational Testing Service, Harvard Educational Review), editor (Ginn & Co., Collier's Encyclopedia, Macmillan) and business executive (Grolier Inc.).
 Alan H. Smith, 1980–1985. Editor (Grolier/Encyclopedia Americana)
 David T. Holland, 1985–1991. Editor (Harcourt Brace, Grolier/Encyclopedia Americana).
 Mark Cummings, 1991–2000. Editor (Macmillan, Oxford University Press).
 Michael Shally-Jensen, 2000–2005. Editor (Merriam-Webster/Encyclopædia Britannica).
 K. Anne Ranson, 2005–2006. Editor (Academic American Encyclopedia, Grolier Multimedia Encyclopedia).
 Joseph M. Castagno, 2006–present. Editor (Grolier/Lands and Peoples, New Book of Popular Science).

See also 
 Lists of encyclopedias

References

External links 

 Text and images of the Encyclopaedia Americana 1851 at the University of Michigan's Making of America site.
 Encyclopedia Americana Description from Grolier online
 Complete hyperlinked editions of the 1904 and 1918-20 eds. at the Online Books Page
  (fulltext)
  (fulltext)

Book series introduced in 1829
English-language encyclopedias
American encyclopedias
1902 non-fiction books
20th-century encyclopedias